Neon Fiction is the third album by Chicago's Sundowner, the acoustic side-project from Chris McCaughan of The Lawrence Arms.

Track listing
"Cemetery West" – 3:47
"My Beautiful Ruins" – 4:26
"Concrete Shoes" – 3:25
"We Drift Eternal" – 3:00
"Grey On Grey" – 2:22
"Life in the Embers" - 3:03
"Origins" – 1:44
"Paper Rose City" – 4:30
"Poet of Trash" – 4:10
"Wildfires" – 3:37

2013 albums
Fat Wreck Chords albums